Shafer is a city in Chisago County, Minnesota, United States. The population was 1,045 at the 2010 census. The city was named for Jacob Shafer, a pioneer settler.

U.S. Highway 8 serves as a main route for the community.

Geography
The Shafer watertower is the highest vertical point in the county.

Festival
The city holds the Shafer Days celebration in early October.

Demographics

2010 census
As of the census of 2010, there were 1,045 people, 379 households, and 272 families residing in the city. The racial makeup of the city was 96.4% White, 0.5% African American, 0.3% Native American, 0.2% Asian, 1.1% from other races, and 1.6% from two or more races. Hispanic or Latino of any race were 2.0% of the population.

There were 379 households, of which 50.1% had children under the age of 18 living with them, 52.8% were married couples living together, 11.1% had a female householder with no husband present, 7.9% had a male householder with no wife present, and 28.2% were non-families. 19.5% of all households were made up of individuals, and 1.4% had someone living alone who was 65 years of age or older. The average household size was 2.76 and the average family size was 3.18.

The median age in the city was 29.4 years. 33.9% of residents were under the age of 18; 5.8% were between the ages of 18 and 24; 38.2% were from 25 to 44; 17.4% were from 45 to 64; and 4.7% were 65 years of age or older. The gender makeup of the city was 51.7% male and 48.3% female.

2000 census
As of the census of 2000, there were 343 people, 124 households, and 93 families residing in the city. The racial makeup of the city was 99.13% White, 0.29% African American, and 0.58% from two or more races. Hispanic or Latino of any race were 1.75% of the population.

There were 124 households, out of which 41.1% had children under the age of 18 living with them, 46.0% were married couples living together, 23.4% had a female householder with no husband present, and 25.0% were non-families. 21.0% of all households were made up of individuals, and 0.8% had someone living alone who was 65 years of age or older.  The average household size was 2.77 and the average family size was 3.09.

In the city, the population was spread out, with 32.9% under the age of 18, 8.2% from 18 to 24, 32.7% from 25 to 44, 19.2% from 45 to 64, and 7.0% who were 65 years of age or older.  The median age was 31 years. For every 100 females, there were 99.4 males.  For every 100 females age 18 and over, there were 94.9 males.

The median income for a household in the city was $41,667, and the median income for a family was $43,000. Males had a median income of $32,656 versus $27,250 for females. The per capita income for the city was $17,561.  About 5.1% of families and 9.1% of the population were below the poverty line, including 14.2% of those under age 18 and none of those age 65 or over.

See also
 Chisago Lakes School District

References

External links
 City Website
 Shafer, Minnesota at the Minnesota Historical Society.

Cities in Chisago County, Minnesota
Cities in Minnesota